Saint-Raphaël-Valescure station is a railway station serving the town Saint-Raphaël, Var department, southeastern France. It is situated on the Marseille–Ventimiglia railway. The station is served by high speed trains to Paris, Nancy and Nice, and regional trains (TER Provence-Alpes-Côte d'Azur) to Nice, Marseille and Toulon.

See also 

 List of SNCF stations in Provence-Alpes-Côte d'Azur

References

External links
 

Railway stations in Var

Railway stations in France opened in 1863